Puerto Rico Highway 873 (PR-873) is a north–south road located in the municipality of San Juan, Puerto Rico, and it corresponds to an original segment of the historic Carretera Central. The General Norzagaray Bridge is located on this route.

Major intersections

See also

 List of highways numbered 873

References

External links
 

873